Merch Bradt Stewart (June 24, 1875 – July 3, 1934), often called M. B. Stewart was a writer, educator, and career United States Army officer who became superintendent of the United States Military Academy. Stewart authored several U.S. Army manuals, penned a popular narrative of his considerable experiences as second lieutenant in the Spanish–American War, and in the years preceding World War I wrote essays informing the public on issues of physical and military education.

Early life
Merch Stewart was born in Mitchells, Virginia, June 24, 1875. Appointed from New York to the United States Military Academy, he graduated in the bottom half of his cadet class of 1896.

Military career
After brief assignment to the 11th Infantry, Stewart was transferred to the 8th Infantry Regiment, served three years on the Platte River and was detailed to topographic service before the outbreak of the Spanish–American War. He was with his regiment in operations before Santiago, Cuba, including the Battle of El Caney and the Battle of San Juan Hill. After the surrender of Santiago, Stewart saw duty for a time as aide-de-camp to Major General William Ludlow.  He received the Silver Star for heroism at El Caney.

Stewart was regimental commissary until his unit's deployment to the Philippine Islands in 1901, where he served first as quartermaster, then as garrison commander at Pagsanjan, Laguna. Promoted to captain in the 8th Infantry regiment, Stewart accompanied the regiment to stations at Fort Lawton, Washington and Governor's Island, New York, then spent a three-year tour teaching infantry tactics at the academy before returning to the Philippines with his regiment and then serving with the regiment at the Rock Island Arsenal.

He served in Washington, D.C. as a member of the Infantry Equipment Board in 1909 and 1910, and then as adjutant of the 8th Regiment in Monterey, California, Fort Leavenworth, and Fort Sam Houston until 1911.  He was a member of Infantry Drill Regulation Board in early 1911, and then received promotion to major and assignment with the 5th Infantry Regiment in Puerto Rico until the end of 1912.

Stewart served with the 5th Infantry at Plattsburgh Barracks from 1912 to 1913.  He organized and conducted the Massachusetts officer training school for volunteer reservists in 1913 and 1914, commanded a special experimental training company 1913 and 1914, and served with the 5th Infantry in the Panama Canal Zone from 1914 to 1916.  He returned to Plattsburgh in 1916 to lead reserve officer training schools, and later that year received assignment as inspector general of the District of Columbia National Guard. In 1917, he again commanded officer training schools in Plattsburgh, and received temporary promotions to lieutenant colonel and colonel as the Army expanded for World War I.

In late 1917 and early 1918, he served briefly on the Army's general staff, and then received assignment as chief of staff for the 76th Division.  After serving in France with the 76th Division, Stewart received promotion to temporary brigadier general and assignment as commander of 175th Brigade, 88th Division.

After the war, Stewart returned to the permanent rank of major and commanded an Overseas Replacement Depot at Fort Meade, Maryland, served again at Fort Leavenworth and on the Army General Staff, and received promotions to permanent lieutenant colonel and colonel.  In 1923 Stewart was assigned as Commandant of Cadets at West Point.  He served until retiring in 1927, and received promotion to permanent brigadier general in 1925, and major general at his retirement.

Awards 
He received the Army Distinguished Service Medal, French Croix de Guerre, and French Legion of Honor.

The citation for his Army DSM reads:

Personal life 
Stewart married Nan Wheelihan of Wisconsin on February 16, 1898.  They had one son: Peter.

Death and legacy 
Stewart died in St. Augustine, Florida, on July 3, 1934, and was buried at West Point Cemetery.

The , launched October 1944, was named in his honor.

Works

References

Further reading

United States Army generals
United States Military Academy alumni
Commandants of the Corps of Cadets of the United States Military Academy
Superintendents of the United States Military Academy
1875 births
1934 deaths
Military personnel from Virginia
American military personnel of the Spanish–American War
Recipients of the Distinguished Service Medal (US Army)
Recipients of the Silver Star
Recipients of the Croix de Guerre 1914–1918 (France)
Recipients of the Legion of Honour
Burials at West Point Cemetery
United States Army generals of World War I